Lewald is a German surname. Notable people with the surname include:

August Lewald (1792–1871), German author
Fanny Lewald (1811–1889), German author and activist, niece of August
Theodor Lewald (1860–1947), German civil servant 

German-language surnames